Elstronwick is a village and civil parish in the East Riding of Yorkshire, England, in an area known as Holderness.

The civil parish is formed by the villages of Elstronwick and Lelley together with the hamlet of Danthorpe.
According to the 2011 UK census, Elstronwick parish had a population of 298, an increase on the 2001 UK census figure of  287.

The parish church of St Lawrence on Front Lane is designated a Grade II listed building and is now recorded in the National Heritage List for England, maintained by Historic England. There is also a chapel. A further Grade II listed building is Elstronwick Hall.

Village amenities include  a small playing field.

In 1823 Baines's History, Directory and Gazetteer of the County of York gave Elstronwick's name as 'Elsternwick'. The village at the time was in the parish of Humbleton and in the Wapentake of Holderness. There was a chapel of ease, "apparently of great antiquity", and a free school. The village had a population of 154, with occupations including six farmers, two wheelwrights, a blacksmith, a shoemaker, and the licensed victualler of The Crown and Anchor public house. Also directory-listed was a school mistress, two gentlemen and a foreman. Once a week a carrier operated between the village and Hull. The Crown and Anchor closed and was converted into cottages .

References

External links

Villages in the East Riding of Yorkshire
Holderness
Civil parishes in the East Riding of Yorkshire